Nisar Fatima Zahra (14 October 1935 – 2 September 1991 in Lahore) was a Pakistani politician and religious scholar who served as a member of the National Assembly of Pakistan. She was daughter of Chaudhry Abdul Rehman Khan from Rehmanabad, Khanqah Dogran. She also served as a member of Islamic Ideology Council. She founded the Apa Nisar Fatima Girls High School, to promote the cause of girls education among low-income people. She was married to the late Iqbal Ahmed Chaudhry and had four sons and two daughters. She was the mother of interior minister of Pakistan, Ahsan Iqbal.

References

Pakistani MNAs 1985–1988
1935 births
1991 deaths